Pajtuny  is a village in the administrative district of Gmina Purda, within Olsztyn County, Warmian-Masurian Voivodeship, in northern Poland. It is located within the historic region of Warmia.

The village was founded in 1374. In the interwar period the nearby settlement of Pajtuński Młyn was separated from the village.

Before 1772 the area was part of Kingdom of Poland, from 1772 Prussia and after 1871 Germany, and after 1945 again Poland.

Two historic wayside shrines, typical for Warmia, are located within the village.

References

Pajtuny